Lucius Mendel Rivers Jr. (born October 6, 1947) is an American attorney and former politician in the state of South Carolina. He served in the South Carolina House of Representatives as a member of the Democratic Party from 1972 to 1974, representing Charleston County, South Carolina. The son of longtime South Carolina Congressman L. Mendel Rivers, born while his father was serving in Washington, D.C.; he is now a lawyer in Charleston. He attended Georgetown University.

References

1947 births
Living people
Democratic Party members of the South Carolina House of Representatives
Politicians from Alexandria, Virginia
People from Charleston County, South Carolina
Lawyers from Charleston, South Carolina
Georgetown University alumni
Lawyers from Alexandria, Virginia